James Larkin (22 August 1932 – 6 October 1998) was an Irish Gaelic footballer and politician. He won five Donegal Senior Football Championship medals with the St Eunan's club. He was nominated by the Taoiseach Charles Haughey to Seanad Éireann in 1982, he served until 1983. He was elected a member of the Letterkenny Urban District Council in 1967 and was chairman of the council on five occasions. Larkin was founder member of Independent Fianna Fáil. He was the director of elections for Independent Fianna Fáil leader Neil Blaney. His son Dessie Larkin was a Fianna Fáil member of Donegal County Council from 1999 until 2014.

References

1932 births
1998 deaths
Independent Fianna Fáil politicians
Irish sportsperson-politicians
Local councillors in County Donegal
Members of the 16th Seanad
Nominated members of Seanad Éireann
People from Letterkenny
Politicians from County Donegal
St Eunan's Gaelic footballers